The Viscounts may refer to:

The Viscounts (American band)
The Viscounts (British band)

See also
Viscount
Viscount (disambiguation)